ENB Beyrouth sometimes just ENB or E.N.B., also known in Arabic as Nadi Abnaa' Neptune is a Lebanese sports club. It is located at Beirut, Lebanon, and was one of the pioneering clubs for Lebanese basketball

ENB Beyrouth basketball team is part of the Lebanese Basketball League.  In earlier days, it was part of the league's top division for many years, but has been relegated for many years now to play in the lower 1st division.

Basketball teams in Lebanon
Sport in Beirut
Organisations based in Beirut
Year of establishment missing